Holtzinger is an unincorporated community in Yakima County, Washington, United States, located approximately five miles northwest of Yakima.

History
The town was named Earle Spur in 1917 when a spur of the Cowiche branch of Northern Pacific Railway ran to the Earle Fruit Company Warehouse. In April 1927, the railroad renamed the town to Holtzinger after C. M. Holtzinger, the then current owner of the warehouse and the Holtzinger Company located in Yakima.

References

Northern Pacific Railway
Unincorporated communities in Yakima County, Washington
Unincorporated communities in Washington (state)